Robert Burton (11 April 1885 – 14 June 1950) was a British track and field athlete who competed in the 1912 Summer Olympics. In 1912 he was eliminated in the first round of the 800 metres competition.

References

External links
profile

1885 births
1950 deaths
British male middle-distance runners
Olympic athletes of Great Britain
Athletes (track and field) at the 1912 Summer Olympics